This is a list of the various professional bodies and organisations that seek to provide regulation and oversight over individuals and firms operating in the accountancy industry.

Accounting standard-setting bodies
Accounting standard setting bodies are national or international organisations that have been delegated responsibility for setting Generally Accepted Accounting Principles by statute in a country or jurisdiction.

International
The International Accounting Standards Board issues IFRS
The International Federation of Accountants (with its International Public Sector Accounting Standards Board - IPSASB) issues IPSAS for Government/Public entities accounting.
The IFRS Foundation
Albania
Albanian National Accounting Council
Australia
Australian Accounting Standards Board
Bhutan
 Accounting and Auditing Standard Board of Bhutan
 Botswana
 Botswana Institute of Chartered Accountants
Canada
CICA's Accounting Standards Board "AcSB"
France
Autorité des Normes Comptables (ANC) (formerly the Conseil National de la Comptabilité)
Germany
Accounting Standards Committee of Germany (ASCG, in German: DRSC)
India
National Advisory Committee on Accounting Standards (NACAS) with the aide and advice of Institute of Chartered Accountants of India and Institute of Cost Accountants of India
Getting replaced soon by NFRA in the Company Bill 2012.
Iran
Accounting Standards Board
Malaysia
Malaysian Accounting Standards Board
Malta
Maltese Accountancy Board
New Zealand
Accounting Standards Review Board
Nigeria
Institution of Chartered Accountants of Nigeria (ICAN)
Association of National Accountants of Nigeria (ANAN)
Pakistan
The Institute of Certified General Accountants (CGA-Pakistan)
Philippines
Financial Reporting Standards Council (FRSC)
Saudi Arabia
Saudi Organization for Certified Public Accountants  (SOCPA)
South Africa
South African Institute of Chartered Accountants (SAICA)
South African Institute of Professional Accountants (SAIPA)
United Kingdom and Ireland
Accounting Standards Board
United States
National Association of State Boards of Accountancy (NASBA)
Financial Accounting Standards Board (FASB)
AICPA Accounting Principles Board (APB)
Governmental Accounting Standards Board (GASB)
Federal Accounting Standards Advisory Board (FASAB)

Professional bodies

Professional bodies represent the interests of their members by lobbying governments, and provide the framework for self-regulation where this is permitted by statute. Professional bodies are also responsible for administering training and examinations for students and members.

The primary bodies in each country are affiliated to the International Federation of Accountants while a few do not belong to IFAC as they operate more like specialist bodies helping the work of accountants and auditors such as the field of taxation, forensic auditing and systems auditing. These bodies include:
The Association of Certified Public Accountants (ICPAGLOBAL)
The Institute of Certified Public Accountants (CPA India) 
Institute of Chartered Tax Practitioners India (ICTPI) 
Association of Chartered Certified Accountants (ACCA)
American Institute of Certified Public Accountants (AICPA)
Association of Accountancy Bodies in West Africa (ABWA)
Association of Accounting Technicians (AAT)
Institute of Chartered Accountants Ghana (ICAG)
Institute of Certified Public Accountants of Kenya
Association of International Accountants (AIA)
Association of National Accountants of Nigeria (ANAN)
Botswana Institute of Chartered Accountants (BICA)
Chartered Accountants Australia and New Zealand (CAANZ)
Chartered Institute of Management Accountants (CIMA)
Chartered Institute of Public Finance and Accountancy (CIPFA)
Chartered Professional Accountants Canada] (CPA Canada)
CPA Australia
Florida Institute of CPAs
Hong Kong Institute of Certified Public Accountants
Institute of Chartered Accountants in England and Wales (ICAEW)
Institute of Certified Public Accountants in Ireland (CPA)
Chartered Accountants Ireland (CAI)
Institute of Cost Accountants of India (ICMAI)
Institute of Chartered Accountants of India (ICAI)
Institute of Cost and Management Accountants of Bangladesh (ICMAB)
Institute of Chartered Accountants of Nigeria (ICAN)
Institute of Chartered Accountants of Pakistan (ICAP)
Institute of Cost and Management Accountants of Pakistan (ICMAP)
Institute of Chartered Accountants of Bangladesh (ICAB)
Institute of Chartered Accountants of Scotland (ICAS)
Institute of Chartered Accountants of Sri Lanka (ICASL)
Institute of Chartered Accountants of Zimbabwe (ICAZ)
Institute of Financial Accountants (IFA)
Institute of Management Accountants (IMA)
Institute of Public Accountants (IPA)
Institute of Singapore Chartered Accountants (ISCA)
Malaysian Institute of Accountants
Ordre des Experts Comptables de Tunisie
Philippine Institute of Certified Public Accountants
South African Institute of Chartered Accountants (SAICA)
South African Institute of Professional Accountants (SAIPA)
 United Arab Emirates Chartered Accountants (UAECA)
 The Institute of Certified Public Accountants of Indonesia (IAPI)

Oversight boards

Following the Enron scandal some countries removed or limited auditors' rights to self-regulation and set up independent, not-for-profit organisations to regulate the conduct of auditors. (In the EU it is compulsory to have a dedicated supervisory authority, cf. 8th European Directive).

International
The Public Interest Oversight Board provides oversight of the standards-setting bodies within the International Federation of Accountants
France
Haut Conseil du Commissariat aux Comptes (HCCC)
Germany
German Auditor Oversight Commission (in German: APAK)
Ireland
Irish Auditing and Accounting Supervisory Authority
United Kingdom
Professional Oversight Team (Financial Reporting Council)
United States
Public Company Accounting Oversight Board

Auditing standards-setting bodies
Pronouncements by the International Auditing and Assurance Standards Board (IAASB) govern audit, review and other assurance services conducted in accordance with international standards. Most countries that have adopted the International Standards on Auditing (ISAs) still retain the national auditing standards setting body to enact the international standards in their country.

International
International Auditing and Assurance Standards Board (IAASB) of the International Federation of Accountants (IFAC).
Forensic Auditors Certification Board (FACB)
INTOSAI for Government auditing by Supreme Audit Institutions (SAI)
Australia
AUASB - Auditing & Assurance Standards Board
Canada
Canadian Auditing and Assurance Standards Board
France
Compagnie nationale des commissaires aux comptes (CNCC)
Ordre des Experts-Comptables (OEC)
Institut Francais des Auditeurs et Controleurs Internes (IFACI) (Unregulated Internal Auditing Guidelines)
Hong Kong
Hong Kong Institute of Certified Public Accountants
India
National accounting standard setting board. NACAS.
Malaysia
Malaysian Institute of Accountants
Nepal
Institute of Chartered Accountants of Nepal
Philippines
Auditing and Assurance Standards Council (AASC)
South Africa
Public Accountants and Auditors Board
United Kingdom and Ireland
Auditing Practices Board
United States
Public Company Accounting Oversight Board - public companies
American Institute of Certified Public Accountants - general
Government Accountability Office - recipients of federal grants and government organizations
Institute of Internal Auditors (IIA) (Unregulated Internal Auditing Guidelines)
Information Systems Audit and Control Association (ISACA) (Unregulated Information System Internal Auditing Guidelines)

See also
Accountancy
Audit
International Standards on Auditing
IFAC Member Bodies and Associates

References